The I. I. Rabi Award, founded in 1983, is awarded annually by IEEE.

 "The Rabi Award is to recognize outstanding contributions related to the fields of atomic and molecular frequency standards, and time transfer and dissemination."

The award is named after Isidor Isaac Rabi, Nobel Prize winner in 1944. He was the first recipient of the award, for his experimental and theoretical work on atomic beam resonance spectroscopy.

Recipients 

 1983 - I. I. Rabi
 1984 - David W. Allan
 1985 - Norman Ramsey, Nobel Prize in 1989
 1986 - Jerrold R. Zacharias
 1987 - Louis Essen
 1988 - Gernot M. R. Winkler
 1989 - Leonard S. Cutler
 1990 - Claude Audoin
 1991 - Andrea De Marchi
 1992 - James A. Barnes
 1993 - Robert F. C. Vessot
 1994 - Jacques Vanier
 1995 - Fred L. Walls
 1996 - Andre Clairon and Robert E. Drullinger
 1997 - Harry E. Peters and Nikolai A. Demidov
 1998 - David J. Wineland, Nobel Prize in 2012
 1999 - Bernard Guinot
 2000 - William J. Riley Jr.
 2001 - Lute Maleki
 2002 - Jon H. Shirley
 2003 - Andreas Bauch
 2005 - Theodor W. Hänsch, Nobel Prize in 2005
 2004 - John L. Hall, Nobel Prize in 2005
 2006 - James C. Bergquist
 2007 - Patrick Gill and Leo Hollberg
 2008 - Hidetoshi Katori
 2009 - John D. Prestage
 2010 - Long Sheng Ma
 2011 - Fritz Riehle
 2012 - James Camparo
 2013 - Judah Levine
 2014 - Harald R. Telle
 2015 - 
 2016 - John Kitching
 2017 - Scott Diddams
 2018 - Jun Ye
 2019 - Steven Jefferts 
 2020 - Robert Lutwak
 2021 - Ekkehard Peik

See also

 List of physics awards

References

Physics awards
Awards established in 1983
Atomic physics
Atomic, molecular, and optical physics